Gorun may refer to:

 Gorun, a village in Shabla Municipality, Dobrich Province, northeastern Bulgaria
 Gorun, a village in Oniceni, Neamţ County, Romania
 Kameh Gorun, village in Rudan County, Hormozgan Province, Iran

Given name 
 Rodion Doru Gorun Cămătaru, Romanian footballer

See also 
 Goruni (disambiguation)
 Gorunești (disambiguation)
 Goruna, a village in Cocorăştii Mislii commune in Prahova County, Romania
 Gorunaka, a village in the Etropole commune in Bulgaria - see Etropole